Alexey Viktorovich Kuzmichev or Kousmichoff (Russian: Алексей Викторович Кузьмичёв) is a Russian businessman. He is one of the founders of the LetterOne Group (LetterOne) and the Alfa Group.

Kuzmichev is a stakeholder in VimpelCom, Alfa-Bank, and X5 Retail Group. In March 2013, Kuzmichev sold his stake in energy venture TNK-BP to state-run oil company Rosneft for $2.5 billion. Forbes magazine rated Kuzmichev as the 138th world's richest person in 2013 with a fortune estimated at $8.8 billion.

Early life and career
Kuzmichev was born in 1962 in Kirov, Russia. Between 1980 and 1982 he served in the army on the Soviet-Chinese border as a radio operator. During this time he joined the Communist party.

In 1983, he enrolled in the Moscow Institute of Steel and Alloys where he met his future business partners, Mikhail Fridman and German Khan. In 1988 Kuzmichev, Fridman and Khan, along with Mikhail Alfimov, founded Alfa Photo, which specialized in the import of photo chemicals.

Later, Kuzmichev convinced his partners to diversify into the export business. Thus in 1998 Alfa Eco was founded. This venture would become the basis of Alfa Group Consortium. (In 2005, Alfa Eco was rebranded as A1).

Alfa Group
Alfa Group's portfolio includes the largest commercial bank in Russia, Alfa-Bank, (with affiliates in Ukraine, Kazakhstan, Belarus and the Netherlands/Amsterdam Trade Bank); international telecom company VimpelCom (the sixth largest mobile network operator in the world by subscribers as of April, 2012); as well as holding shares in Turkish telecommunications company Turkcell. Until April 2012, Alfa Group owned 25 percent of Russian cell phone operator MegaFon; it sold its share for $5.2 billion. Alfa also has stakes in Russian retailer X5 Retail Group, Rosvodokanal Group; and insurance company, Alfa-Strakhovanie Group. Kuzmichev owns over 18 percent of the consortium's joint assets and is a member of the board of directors of Alfa Finance Holdings. The Group's major transactions include TNK oil company privatization, which later became a part of TNK-BP venture, Russia's third-largest oil producer. In March 2013 Alfa Group and its joint partners AAR Consortium sold 50 percent of TNK-BP to Russian oil company Rosneft.

Kuzmichev is responsible for overseeing Alfa Group’s international trading operations.

Sinking of The Prestige
Crown Resources, a European oil and commodity trading arm of Alfa Group, of which Kuzmichev is chairman, was the owner of the oil cargo on The Prestige vessel, which sank near the coast of Galicia, Spain in 2002. The case concerning The Prestige centred on the negligence of the vessel's owner and was completed in July 2013. No accusations or financial claims were brought against Crown Resources.

LetterOne Group
Kuzmichev is one of the original founders of the LetterOne Group. The LetterOne Group (LetterOne) is an international investment business based in Luxembourg. Its investments are focused on the telecoms, technology and energy sectors through its two main business units, L1 Energy and L1 Technology. 
Despite recently being required by the Government to sell their North Sea oil and gas fields, LetterOne have reportedly been told in a letter from a senior UK official that this 'is not a judgement on the suitability of LetterOne's owners to control these or any other assets in the UK.

International sanctions due to 
2 of Kuzmichev's yachts have been seized by France due the sanctions against Russians billionaires after the invasion of Ukraine by Russia.

Kuzmichev is married to Svetlana Kuzmicheva-Uspenskaya. In 2016, he bought a $42 million mansion in New York City.

See also
List of billionaires
List of Russian billionaires

References

External links
Alfa-Group Global

 https://thehill.com/opinion/judiciary/3496659-how-the-sussmann-trial-revealed-hillary-clintons-role-in-the-alfa-bank-scandal/

Alfa Group
National University of Science and Technology MISiS alumni
1963 births
Living people
Russian venture capitalists
Russian billionaires
Russian individuals subject to European Union sanctions
Russian businesspeople in Cyprus
Russian activists against the 2022 Russian invasion of Ukraine